The Bingongina or Pinkangarna are a possible indigenous Australian people of the Northern Territory. However, the name may simply be a former alternative term for Mudburra.

Country
The southwestern boundary lay at Winnecke Creek (Morerinju.).  tribespeople.

Social organization
The Bingongina marriage system was claimed to exhibit patrilineal descent by Spencer and Gillen in 1904, analyzing the class relations in terms of two moieties, respectively Wiliuku and Liaraku. This view challenged by R. H. Mathews who asserted that the cycles actually allowed for matrilineal descent.

Alternative names
 Bugongidja. (exonym used by northern tribes).

Notes

Citations

Sources

Aboriginal peoples of the Northern Territory